Makerere University School of Women and Gender Studies (MSWGS) is one of the schools that comprise the Makerere University College of Humanities and Social Sciences, a constituent college of Makerere University, Uganda's oldest and largest public university.

Location 
MSWGS  is located along the pool road, opposite the Swimming pool within Makerere University Premises, adjacent to Makerere University College of Business and Management Science, in Kampala, Uganda.

See also 

 Education in Uganda
 Makerere University

External links 

 Website of Makerere University School of Women & Gender Studies
 Website of Makerere University College of Humanities & Social Sciences

References 

Makerere University
Gender studies articles needing attention